Shchigrovsky District is an administrative and municipal district (raion), one of the twenty-eight in Kursk Oblast, Russia. It is located in the north of the oblast. Its administrative center is the town of Shchigry (which is not administratively a part of the district). Population:  15,099 (2002 Census);

Administrative and municipal status
Within the framework of administrative divisions, Shchigrovsky District is one of the twenty-eight in the oblast. The town of Shchigry serves as its administrative center, despite being incorporated separately as a town of oblast significance—an administrative unit with the status equal to that of the districts.

As a municipal division, the district is incorporated as Shchigrovsky Municipal District. The town of oblast significance of Shchigry is incorporated separately from the district as Shchigry Urban Okrug.

References

Notes

Sources

Districts of Kursk Oblast
